Stanley Ratifo (born 5 December 1994) is a professional footballer who plays as a forward for 1. CfR Pforzheim. Born in Germany, he represents the Mozambique national team.

International career
Ratifo was born in Germany to a Mozambican father and German mother. He represents the Mozambique national team since 2017.

International goals
Scores and results list Mozambique's goal tally first.

References

External links
 
 Stanley Ratifo on Fupa.net

1994 births
Living people
Mozambican footballers
Mozambique international footballers
German footballers
Mozambican people of German descent
German people of Mozambican descent
Association football forwards
3. Liga players
Regionalliga players
Hallescher FC players
1. FC Köln II players